Ajoy Bose (born 1952) is a Bengali-Indian author, political journalist and television commentator. His books include For Reasons of State: Delhi under Emergency (1977, written with John Dayal) on the Emergency; The Shah Commission Begins (1978, with Dayal); Behenji (2009), a biography of Indian politician and social reformer Mayawati; and Across the Universe: The Beatles in India (2018).

His writing has appeared in the publications Scroll.in, Quartz, Outlook, Economic and Political Weekly and Firstpost. In 2021, he made his directorial debut with the documentary film The Beatles and India. He has worked as a resident commentator for CNN-News18.

Bose grew up in Calcutta.

References

External links
 Ajoy Bose hosting Philip Norman at the 2018 Jaipur Literature Festival

1952 births
Indian political journalists
Indian writers
Indian documentary film directors
Living people
Film directors from Kolkata
Journalists from West Bengal
Indian male writers
21st-century Bengalis
Indian journalists
21st-century Indian journalists

Indian non-fiction writers